Nasrabad (also Romanized as Naşrābād; also known as Gīvān its ancient name) is a city in the Jarghuyeh County (Lower Jarghuyeh District), in Isfahan Province, Iran. At the 2006 census, its population was 5,751, in 1,361 families.

References

Populated places in Isfahan County

Cities in Isfahan Province